Faizullapur is a village  in Nawabganj Bareilly district, Uttar Pradesh.

Notes

Villages in Bareilly district